Basketball at the 1969 South Pacific Games was played at Port Moresby, Papua New Guinea in August 1969. Men's and women's tournaments were held with eight and six teams, respectively, competing.

After a round robin stage the teams in the top two positions played off for the gold and silver medals, and the teams in the third and fourth positions played off for the bronze medal.

Medal summary

Men's tournament

Standings

Final standings after the round robin tournament:

Group matches

Bronze medal game

Men's final

Women's tournament

Standings 

Final standings after the round robin tournament:

Group matches

Bronze medal playoff

Women's final

See also
Basketball at the Pacific Games

References

1969 Pacific Games
1969
Pacific